Aathvaan Vachan - Saath Vachano Se Badhkar (English: The Eighth Vow - Greater Than The Seven Vows) was an Indian Hindi television series that aired on Sony Entertainment Television India from 1 September 2008 to 21 May 2009.

Plot

The story is based on the life of a young woman named Manali, with a mentally challenged younger sister, Urmi. Usually, a traditional Hindu marriage involves seven vows. Manali marries Aadesh, who takes an eighth vow (aathvaan vachan) that he will take care of Urmi for life. The show traces the story of their lives as a family.

Urmi's arrival to their home does not go down well with most members of Aadesh's family. Manali tries her best to balance her duties as a wife, a sister, and a daughter-in-law. Some time later, Manali is murdered mysteriously but Aadesh's mother covers up the truth and Aadesh is told that it was an accident. As Aadesh tries to pick up the pieces after this sudden tragedy, he must take care of Urmi. Gradually, Urmi begins to recover. Aadesh's family wants him to remarry but he continues to be committed to the promise of caring for Urmi. As time passes, complications arise as a recovering Urmi realises she may have deeper feelings for Aadesh. However, by now Aadesh is engaged to business partner Sneha who he connects with based on their past experiences of getting over personal tragedies. A conflicted Urmi decides to finally leave Aadesh's life so they can both move on but now Aadesh feels uncomfortable at the idea of Urmi living independently.

Cast 
Vishal Singh as Aadesh
Mouli Ganguly as Manali
Vinny Arora as Urmila Shastri/Urmi 
Alka Kaushal / Niyati Joshi as Aadesh's mother
Sulabha Arya as Manali and Urmi's mother
Varun Khandelwal as Tarun, Aadesh's older brother
Nivaan Sen as Football Coach
Dimple Inamdar as Tarun's wife
 Manish Khanna
Pallavi Subhash as Sneha Ahuja, who is later engaged to Aadesh
Gulfam Khan as Biloo Mausi

References

External links 
Official site on SET India
Aathvaan Vachan site on SET Asia

Sony Entertainment Television original programming
2008 Indian television series debuts
2009 Indian television series endings
Indian television soap operas
Rose Audio Visuals